Ballygarrett-Réalt na Mara GAA is a Gaelic Athletic Association club located in County Wexford, Ireland. The club fields teams in both hurling, Gaelic football, camogie and Ladies' Gaelic football.

History

The history of Gaelic games in the Courtown-Ballygarrett area of County Wexford dates back to the 1920s. Réalt na Mara, which was based in Courtown, was noted as a hurling club and competed in the local championships over a 40-year period before its decline. Ballygarrett concentrated on Gaelic football club in the early years but later became a hurling-oriented club. Réalt na Mara was reformed as a Gaelic football club in 1979. Three years later in 1982, Réalt na Mara and Ballygarrett amalgamated to form the present-day club.

Since 1990, the club has enjoyed several championship successes across both codes. Wexford JAFC titles were secured in 1990 and 2002, while the corresponding Wexford JAHC title was won in 2004. This was followed by Wexford IAHC titles in 2007 and 2019.

Honours

Wexford Intermediate A Hurling Championship (2): 2007, 2019
Wexford Junior A Hurling Championship (1): 2004
Wexford Junior A Football Championship (2): 1990, 2002

Notable players

 Cathal Dunbar: Leinster SHC-winner (2019)

References

Gaelic games clubs in County Wexford
Gaelic football clubs in County Wexford
Hurling clubs in County Wexford